Somersville Towne Center is a regional shopping mall located in Antioch, California. Previously named County East Mall until 2004, the  mall is managed by Urban Retail Properties. Originally opened in 1966, it is strategically positioned in one of the fastest growing areas of the San Francisco Bay Area, east Contra Costa County. Along with high population growth, east Contra Costa County is also experiencing sizable household income increases.

Somersville Towne Center is the only enclosed regional shopping mall in east Contra Costa County and also the first such mall in the southeast portion of Antioch. The next closest shopping center of similar size and scale is The Streets of Brentwood open-air shopping center in nearby Brentwood, which opened in 2008. The mall is anchored by 24 Hour Fitness and Smart & Final.

History
County East Mall was opened in 1966 as an open-air shopping center with Sears, Mervyns, and W. T. Grant as the original anchor tenants. The Hahn Company built the center and sold it to Hexalon Real Estate in 1978.

In the mid-1970s, JCPenney replaced Grant's as the center's third anchor. A major overhaul in the late-1980s transformed the center into an enclosed shopping mall with Gottschalks added as a fourth anchor tenant. JCPenney closed on January 25, 1997, and was occupied for several years by a furniture retailer until the  building was gutted in 2003 and replaced by the larger two-story Macy's anchor in 2004. Further expansion brought in a Michael's which later became a Marshalls as a fifth anchor in March 2008. In August 2008, Mervyns announced it would close several underperforming stores, including the Somersville Towne Center location, which closed in December of that year. Gottschalks closed due to bankruptcy in 2009, leaving two anchors vacant at the mall. In late 2012, it was announced that a trampoline park was slated to take a portion of the former Gottschalks.  In December 2016, half of the former Gottschalks building became a 24 Hour Fitness Super Sport club; the other half of the building remains vacant.

In 2013, Factory 2-U opened a Fallas Paredes store in the former Mervyns location and became an anchor tenant. A year later, the mall was sold by Macerich to Time Equities, with Spinoso Real Estate Group as leasing agent. Marshalls closed in 2013 and the space remained vacant until 2015, when Smart & Final opened up as a replacement tenant.  In November 2018, Hibbett Sports opened up in the mall, replacing the spaces that Hot Topic & Zumiez occupied which closed in 2013 & 2018, respectively.

On August 6, 2019, it was announced that Sears would be closing the Somersville Town Center location in October 2019 as part of a plan to close 26 stores nationwide.

On January 8, 2020, it was announced that Macy's would be closing in April 2020 as part of a plan to close 125 stores nationwide. After Macy's closed, Fallas closed in August 2022 and the space is now vacant. As of September 2022, 24 Hour Fitness, and Smart & Final are the only anchor stores left.

Renovations
In 1989, County East Mall was converted from an open-air shopping center to an enclosed shopping mall. The mall's most recent renovation was in 2004, which included the name change to Somersville Towne Center along with the opening of the Macy's anchor tenant in a new two-story building, and a cosmetic makeover of the mall's interior. The new construction and makeover, which included new paint, new landscaping, new flooring, and improvements to the mall's entrances, cost a reported US$20 million.

References

External links
 Somersville Towne Center website

Shopping malls in the San Francisco Bay Area
Antioch, California
Shopping malls in Contra Costa County, California
Shopping malls established in 1966